The NBB All-Star Weekend is an annual event involving the All-Star players of each season of the Novo Basquete Brasil (New Basketball Brazil), which is the top-tier level Brazilian professional club basketball league. This event features the NBB Dunks Tournament and the NBB Three-point Tournament (both featured since the first edition of the All-Star Weekend), and the NBB Skills Challenge (featured since the 2011 edition). The NBB All-Star Weekend also features the NBB All-Star Game, as its main event.

NBB All-Star Game

The NBB All-Star Game is an annual game involving the All-Star players of each season of the Novo Basquete Brasil (New Basketball Brazil), which is the top-tier level Brazilian professional club basketball league. The players are chosen by votes on the Internet, and are then divided into two teams. The criterion for the selection of the teams has varied during the years.

NBB Dunks Tournament

NBB Three-point Tournament

NBB Skills Challenge

References

External links
Official website 
New Basketball Brazil at Latinbasket.com

Novo Basquete Brasil